Mary Moody is an Australian author.

Mary Moody may also refer to:

 Mary Blair Moody (1837–1919), American physician
 Mary Moody Northen (1892–1986), née Mary Moody, American financier and philanthropist

See also
 Mary Moody Emerson (1774–1863), American letter writer and diarist